The Beckoning Silence is a 2007 British television film that follows and retraces the 1936 Eiger north face climbing disaster where five climbers perished while attempting to scale the north face of the Eiger mountain in Switzerland. The film features climber Joe Simpson, whose book of the same name inspired the film.

In 2008 it won an International Emmy Award.

Cast 

 Andreas Abegglen as Willy Angerer
  as Andreas Hinterstoisser
 Cyrille Berthod as Edi Rainer
  as Toni Kurz
 Joe Simpson as himself
 Steven Mackintosh as the narrator

References

External links

The Beckoning Silence - Extras: The Making of on YouTube

British television films
Eiger
2000s English-language films